Project Icarus may refer to:

 Project Icarus (interstellar), a study started in 2009 for the design of an interstellar space probe.
 Project Icarus (photography), a 2009 Massachusetts Institute of Technology photography project.
 Project Icarus, a 1967 MIT student project to defend against risks from the asteroid 1566 Icarus.
 "Project Icarus", the working title of the 2013 Irrational Games video game, BioShock Infinite.
 Icarus Project, a methodology in the diagnosis of mentally ill patients.

See also
 Icarus (disambiguation)